Nepal Mountain Academy (NMA) is a Nepalese government-owned moutaineering school. It functions under the Ministry of Culture, Tourism and Civil Aviation (Nepal).

History 
The school was opened in 2002. And, since 2017-2018, the academic courses offered are associated with Tribhuvan University's Faculty of Management. Field training and climbing activities are conducted at Solukhumbu campus.

List of expeditions 

 2021, a 18-members team consisting of NMA-run first batch of Bachelor of Mountaineering Studies (BMS) climbed Mera Peak - (. In their final semesters, students must climb 6,000-7,000 metre peaks to complete their undergraduate program.

See also 

 Nepal Mountaineering Association

References 

Educational institutions established in 2002
Education in Nepal
Mountaineering in Nepal
Mountaineering training institutes